Artificial nutrition may refer to:
Feeding tube
Feeding by nasogastric tube
Parenteral nutrition